Vyacheslav Fadeyevich Khizhnyakov (born 6 February 1952), is a Russian politician who served as the third  to the Federation Council from 1999 to 2004.

Biography
Vyacheslav Khizhnyakov was born on 6 February 1952. From 1969 to 1975, he was a mechanic at the Volgodonsk chemical plant. In 1975, he graduated from the Rostov Institute of Agricultural Engineering with a degree as a foundry engineer. From 1975 to 1983, he was a foreman, then senior foreman, and then the head of the casting shop, and chief metallurgist of Pishmash Production Association in Kirovograd. From 1983 to 1986, he was the head of the PDO of the Volgodonsk plant of radio equipment. From 1987 to 1990, he was the deputy director for Production and Sales, Secretary of the Party Committee of the Volgodonsk Experimental Plant. From 1990 to 1991, he was the Deputy Chairman of the executive committee of the Volgodonsk City Council of People's Deputies, which he supervised on economic issues.

From 1991 to 1996, Khizhnyakov was the head of Volgodonsk. In 1993, Khizhnyakov ran for the elections to the State Duma from the Choice of Russia party, but was not elected. From 1996 to 1999, he was an advisor to the Governor of Rostov Oblast, and then the Deputy Governor of Rostov Oblast for Cossacks and Ecology. From 1997 to 1999, Khizhnyakov became the first military ataman of the military Cossack society "Great Don Army".

The press has repeatedly accused Khizhnyakov of maintaining ties with the entrepreneur and head of the  criminal group Yevgeny Kudryavtsev. Khizhnyakov was removed from the post as Plenipotentiary Representative in the Federation Council on 5 April 2004, after a commission of the Ministry of Internal Affairs conducted an investigation in Volgodonsk into mass extortion from entrepreneurs by members of Olimp. He was appointed assistant to the Plenipotentiary Representative in the Central Federal District instead.

Family
Khizhnyakov is married and has two daughters.

References

1952 births
Living people
Russian politicians
People from Sakhalin Oblast
Recipients of the Order of Holy Prince Daniel of Moscow